Euxoa occidentalis is a species of cutworm or dart moth in the family Noctuidae. It was described by J. Donald Lafontaine and J.R. Byers in 1982 and is found in North America.

The MONA or Hodges number for Euxoa occidentalis is 10781.1.

References

 Lafontaine, J. Donald & Schmidt, B. Christian (2010). "Annotated check list of the Noctuoidea (Insecta, Lepidoptera) of North America north of Mexico". ZooKeys, vol. 40, 1-239.

Further reading

 Butterflies and Moths of North America
 NCBI Taxonomy Browser, Euxoa occidentalis
 Arnett, Ross H. (2000). American Insects: A Handbook of the Insects of America North of Mexico. CRC Press.

Noctuinae
Moths described in 1982